Netherthorpe School is a secondary school with academy status based in Staveley in the Chesterfield district of Derbyshire, England.

History

The school was founded in 1572

A quote from an 1857 directory:

Netherthorpe School.—Francis Rodes, by will, 29th of Elizabeth, left a yearly rent charge of £20 per annum, to be taken forth of his manor of Elmton; £8 thereof to the Grammar school, at Staveley Netherthorpe, £8 for two scholarships in St. John's, Cambridge, and £4 for the relief of soldiers who should be sent to the wars out of Staveley, Barlborough, and Elmton. Robert Sitwell, by will, 41st Elizabeth, gave a messuage in Killamarsh, on trust, to pay £6 yearly to the schoolmaster. Lord James Cavendish, 1742, left a rent charge of £6, issuing out of closes at Hollingwood, for the maintenance of the schoolmaster. In addition to these, the Rev. Francis Gisborne gave £10, to be invested in stock. The income of the various benefactions amounts to £29 per annum. All the sons of parishioners are considered as entitled to classical instruction; but the master makes his own charge for other branches.

The school was known as Netherthorpe Grammar School. From the 1980s until 1999, it was a grant-maintained school, and became a foundation school. Today it is an academy. The school has undergone refurbishment under the BSF Building Schools for the Future scheme and a range of new purpose built facilities opened in September 2012. On 9 July 2013 the Duke of Devonshire officially opened the new areas of the school.

Debating Society
There is a Senior Debating Society  that has run for ninety-nine years. Netherthorpe School are the current holders of the Derbyshire Debating Trophy.

Academic performance
In 2011, the percentage of students attaining 5 or more higher-grade GCSE passes including English and Maths was 62.4%. A level results were similarly above average.

Notable former pupils

 Nick Ainger (1961–8) –  Labour MP for Carmarthen West
 Peter Hudson – UK Rear-Admiral, – Commander of the United Kingdom Maritime Force (June 2009 – January 2011); Operational Commander – EU Naval Force for Counter Piracy (June 2009 – January 2011)
 Sir Charles Sykes, FRS (1905–1982) - Physicist and metallurgist. Managing Director of Thomas Firth and John Brown Ltd and President of the Institute of Physics. 
 Stan Worthington (1905–1973) – Derbyshire and England Test cricketer
 Ben Slater [1991–Present] Nottinghamshire Cricketer

References

Further reading
 A History of Netherthorpe School, W.E. Godfrey and C. J. G. Bishop

External links
 Netherthorpe School
 EduBase

Educational institutions established in the 1570s
Secondary schools in Derbyshire
1572 establishments in England
Academies in Derbyshire